Carlos Carrasco Rodríguez (born 14 February 1993) is a Spanish footballer who plays as a winger for Segunda División RFEF side Intercity.

Career
Carrasco started his senior career with Segunda División B side Orihuela before joining Eerste Divisie side Dordrecht in July 2013. After making three league appearances for Dordrecht, Carrasco returned to Spain to have spells with Jove Español, Arroyo, Orihuela and Almoradí. In February 2017, he joined 1. deild karla side Leiknir, making six league appearances for the side in the 2017 season. After Leiknir were relegated, he remained with the side for the 2018 season in 2. deild karla, playing seven more times in the league. On 21 March 2019, Carrasco joined Segunda Regional de la Comunidad Valenciana side Alicante City.

References

1993 births
Living people
Footballers from Alicante
Spanish footballers
Association football midfielders
Segunda División B players
Tercera División players
1. deild karla players
2. deild karla players
Orihuela CF players
FC Dordrecht players
Spanish expatriate footballers
Spanish expatriate sportspeople in Iceland
Spanish expatriate sportspeople in the Netherlands
CF Intercity players